The Centrist Union of Moldova (UCM) is a political party in Moldova.

External links
 

2000 establishments in Moldova
Political parties established in 2000
Political parties in Moldova
Social democratic parties in Moldova